Circus Waldissima, (1992-    ) is a theatrical youth circus company operated out of Santa Rosa, California as an after-school program at Summerfield Waldorf School and farm. Founded as a small after-school program with Just a couple kids, and a performance at a school function, the circus has since grown to more than 3 large shows a year with over 100 student participants in the main show, in its very own circus tent.

History Timeline

First classes and first show at the 1992 May Faire celebrations at Summerfield Waldorf School.
In 2010, Circus Waldissima Purchased their first 22m diameter Circus Tent from Segel RAAP in Germany.
First Show in the New Big Top ("Life of a Butterfly") was in 2011.

Shows

2011 
Spring
Life of a Butterfly
Birthday Wishes

2012 
Winter
Winter Show

2013 
Winter
The Night Before Christmas
Spring
Fire and Ice
CandyLand

2014 
Spring
Boomtown Buccaneers
Once Upon a Time

2015 
Spring
The Bridge
Cirque Du Fillet! A circus under the sea

2016 
Spring
Ethos
Charlie and the Chocolate Factory

2017 
Spring
Alchemy
The Wizard of Oz

2018 
Winter
Hanukah Theme
Spring
Under The Big Top
The Jungle Book

In The News

2017
The Press Democrat
picture gallery in the newspaper and online 
Bohemian
Writers Pick 'Best Way to Dangle Your Kids from a Rope'

2016

The Press Democrat
Circus Waldissima rehearsal
Circus Waldissima open Big top show

Sonoma County Gazette
News

2015
The Press Democrat
Theatrics aplenty at Summerfield Waldorf
Circus Waldissima
Ten Days of Fun

2014
The Press Democrat
Circus Waldissima
The Big top come ‘from’ Town

Sonoma County Gazette
In the News

References

External links
 Official Web Site Circus Waldissima
 Official Web Site Circus Waldissima at Summerfield Waldorf

Circus schools